Andriy Ivanovych Lopushynskyi (born 8 October 1974) is a former Ukrainian football player.

References

1974 births
Living people
Ukrainian footballers
FC Hazovyk Komarno players
FC CSKA Kyiv players
Ukrainian Premier League players
FC Fakel Voronezh players
Ukrainian expatriate footballers
Expatriate footballers in Russia
Russian Premier League players
FC Kryvbas Kryvyi Rih players
FC Enerhetyk Burshtyn players
FC Tekhno-Centre Rohatyn players

Association football midfielders